Jonathan Woolf was a British architect.

Early life
He was born in London and educated at Kingston School of Architecture at Kingston University before apprenticing at practices in Rome and later in London, where he was project architect for the house of art collector Charles Saatchi.

Jonathan Woolf Architects

In 1991 he established his own practice. In 2003 the practice completed Brick Leaf House in Hampstead, North London, which received a RIBA Award and a Civic Trust Award, and became the first private building to reach the mid-list of the UK Stirling Prize. Building Design hailed Brick Leaf House as "a statement of real capacity" and in 2004 honoured the practice with the Building Design Architect of the Year Award. Grand Designs presenter Kevin McCloud chose Brick Leaf House as one of his "twenty perfect houses."

The practice’s work ranged from private houses and apartment buildings through to arts, educational, commercial buildings and interiors.

Recognition

The practice won international competitions in Milan for furniture and in Dublin for urban regeneration and in 2007 received an Honorary mention and 7th place amongst the 1,170 entries of the international competition to extend Eric Gunnar Asplund’s 1930s Stockholm City Library.
His Brick Leaf House (Double House) received RIBA  and Civic Trust Awards in 2004.

Notable Projects
Ijaz Apartment, London, 1991
The Lion Rooms, London, 1993
Ziggurat Studio, London, 1993 & 1998
Pocket House, London, 1998
Brick Leaf House, Hampstead, London, 2003;
Mayfair Offices, London, 2006
Two Mayfair Penthouses, London, 2007
Monkey Puzzle Pavilion, Aberdeen, Scotland, 2007
Bloomsbury Apartments, London, 2008
Painted House, London, 2009 
Lost Villa, 2014

Gallery

Monographs
Darco Magazine 12, Darco Editions, Matosinhos, Portugal, 2010; ISSN 1646-950X, 34 pages

References

 Like Leaves on a Tree: three schemes by Jonathan Woolf’ by Tony Fretton, Building Design, 09, 2003

External links
 Jonathan Woolf Architects Official website
 Calderon, Diego, 04.2010, Sobre la construccion de la imagen, Piso Magazine
 Moore, Rowan, 03.2010, Painted House, The Observer
 Davidovici, Irina, 03.2010, Jonathan Woolf's Painted House, The Architects' Journal

1961 births
2015 deaths
21st-century English architects
20th-century English architects
Architects from London